Deployment of the Internet Protocol Version 6 (IPv6), the latest generation of the Internet Protocol, has been in progress since the mid-2000s. IPv6 was designed as a replacement for IPv4. IPv4 has been in use since 1982, and is in the final stages of exhausting its unallocated address space, but still carries most Internet traffic.

 Google's statistics show IPv6 availability of its users at around 37–41% depending on the day of the week (greater on weekends). Adoption is uneven across countries and Internet service providers. Many countries have 0% use while a few have over 50% use, such as India and Germany. In November 2016, 1,491 (98.2%) of the 1,519 top-level domains (TLDs) in the Internet supported IPv6 to access their domain name servers, and 1,485 (97.8%) zones contained IPv6 glue records, and approximately 9.0 million domains (4.6%) had IPv6 address records in their zones. Of all networks in the global BGP routing table, 29.2% had IPv6 protocol support.

By 2011, all major operating systems in use on personal computers and server systems had production-quality IPv6 implementations. Cellular telephone systems present a large deployment field for Internet Protocol devices as mobile telephone service continues to make the transition from 3G to 4G technologies, in which voice is provisioned as a voice over IP (VoIP) service. In 2009, the US cellular operator Verizon released technical specifications for devices to operate on its 4G networks. The specification mandates IPv6 operation according to the 3GPP Release 8 Specifications (March 2009), and deprecates IPv4 as an optional capability.

Deployment tools and evaluation

Rapid deployment tools 
Tools such as 6rd, conceived by Rémi Després, have been developed to enable IPv6 rapid deployment.

Statistics and monitoring 
Google publishes statistics on IPv6 adoption among Google users. A graph of IPv6 adoption since 2008 and a map of IPv6 deployment by country are available.

Akamai publishes by-country and by-network statistics on IPv6 adoption for traffic it sees on its global Content Distribution Network (CDN). This set of data also shows graphs for each country and network over time.

A global view into the history of the growing IPv6 routing tables can be obtained with the SixXS Ghost Route Hunter. This tool provided a list of all allocated IPv6 prefixes until 2014 and marks with colors the ones that were actually being announced into the Internet BGP tables. When a prefix was announced, it means that the ISP at least can receive IPv6 packets for their prefix.

The integration of IPv6 on existing network infrastructure may be monitored from other sources, for example:
Regional Internet registries (RIR) IPv6 prefix allocation
IPv6 transit services
Japan ISP IPv6 services

Testing, evaluation, and certification
A few organizations are involved with international IPv6 test and evaluation, ranging from the United States Department of Defense to the University of New Hampshire.

The US DoD Joint Interoperability Test Command DoD IPv6 Product Certification Program
University of New Hampshire InterOperability Laboratory involvement in the IPv6 Ready Logo Program
SATSIX

Major milestones

Operating system support

By 2011, all major operating systems in use on personal computers and server systems had production-quality IPv6 implementations. Microsoft Windows has supported IPv6 since Windows 2000, and in production-ready state beginning with Windows XP. Windows Vista and later have improved IPv6 support. macOS since Panther (10.3), Linux 2.6, FreeBSD, and Solaris also have mature production implementations. Some implementations of the BitTorrent peer-to-peer file transfer protocol make use of IPv6 to avoid NAT issues common for IPv4 private networks.

Government encouragement
In the early 2000s, governments increasingly required support for IPv6 in new equipment. The US government, for example, specified in 2005 that the network backbones of all federal agencies had to be upgraded to IPv6 by June 30, 2008; this was completed before the deadline. In addition, the US government in 2010 required federal agencies to provide native dual-stacked IPv4/IPv6 access to external/public services by 2012, and internal clients were to utilize IPv6 by 2014. On November 19, 2020, the United States Office of Management and Budget (OMB) issued the latest U. S. federal government IPv6-only policy in its memorandum (M-21-07) directing all federal government agencies to complete at least 80% of the transition from IPv4 to the single stack of IPv6 by 2025. Progress on the US government's external facing IPv6 services is tracked by NIST. The government of the People's Republic of China implemented a five-year plan for deployment of IPv6 called the China Next Generation Internet (see below).

Coexistence with IPv4
On 7 March 2013, the Internet Engineering Task Force created a working group for IPv4 sunset in preparation for protocol changes that could be used to support sunset/shutdown of remanent IPv4 networks. However, in May 2018 this working group was closed as no immediate work could be identified due to the slow transition to IPv6.

The Internet Engineering Task Force expects IPv6 to coexist with IPv4 as it is considered impractical to transition to IPv6 in the short term. The coexistence is expected to be based on dual-stack, tunneling or translation mechanisms. Dual-stack implementations required two parallel logical networks, increasing cost and complexity of the network. IPv4 networks are expected to slowly transition into segmented subnetworks using IPv4 Residual Deployment.

The slow transition to IPv6 has caused significant resentment in the Internet community.

As a result, many larger enterprises, such as Microsoft, are transitioning to phasing out IPv4 and moving towards IPv6 Single-Stack within the company. In a recent blog, the company describes their heavily translated IPv4 network as "potentially fragile", "operationally challenging", and with regard to dual-stack operations (i.e. those running IPv4 and IPv6 simultaneously) "complex".

Deployment by country and region

Algeria
AnwarNet (www.anwarnet.dz); AfriNIC has allocated range of IPv6 address space to AnwarNet. AnwarNet started IPV6 services in 2011.

Australia
AARNet completed network AARNet 3, a high-speed network connecting academic and research customers in the major metropolitan centres, with international links to major ISPs in the US, Asia, and Europe. One of the design goals was to support both IPv4 and IPv6 protocols equally. It also supports multicast routing and jumbo frames.
IPv6 Now Pty Ltd introduced the first commercial-grade IPv6 tunnel broker service in Australia on April 30, 2008. Also, in June 2008, IPv6Now introduced the first dual-stacked (IPv4 & IPv6) web hosting service.
Internode is the first commercial ISP in Australia to have full IPv6 connectivity and make IPv6 available to customers. The availability to customers was officially announced to Whirlpool on July 18, 2008.
The Victorian State government granted A$350,000 to establish an IPv6 testbed network (VIC6) freely available to industry to evaluate their IPv6 products and strategies.
Telstra announced on 5 September 2011 that their backbone network was fully double-stacked and that they had commenced providing its enterprise, government and wholesale customers with IPv6 connectivity, and helping customers through the transition; they would activate IPv6 addressing for its mobile network on 12 September 2016.
Aussie Broadband started enabling IPv6 for all new residential NBN customers' services on 1 November 2021.

Bangladesh
Infolink successfully tested and started commercial IPv6 beta deployment to end user for the first time in Bangladesh on May 22, 2017.
SpeedLinks successfully tested and started commercial IPv6 deployment to end user for the first time in Rangpur Division, Bangladesh on January 25, 2022.

Belgium
On July 13, 2010, Logica Netherlands (operating within the SPITS project in cooperation with Mobistar Belgium) successfully tested native IPv6 over UMTS/GPRS in Belgium and the Netherlands within a vehicle platform as an Intelligent transportation system solution. The test was performed both in gsm and in tethering mode using a Nokia smart-phone.
Since September 2013, research and government ISP Belnet offers native IPV6 to all customers.
VOO A large residential ISP (cable) started its transition in April 2013 leading to impressive growth in IPv6 in Belgium
Telenet started its transition in February 2014, helping to push the Belgian average of IPv6 usage to almost 30% by September 2014 and putting them in the top 10 of worldwide ISPs of which customers are visiting websites with IPv6.
According to APNIC, IPv6 penetration is 52% as of January 2019; penetration briefly peaked around 70% in August 2017.

Brazil
As of April 2021, Brazil has 38.4% IPv6 adoption. IPv6 adoption in the country was boosted in 2015 when the Brazilian telecommunications agency, Anatel, announced that all Internet operators and service providers would be required to provide IPv6 addresses to consumers. This was one of a number of initiatives to increase the speed of deployment.

Bulgaria
Has constructed a research center to study the possibilities of adopting IPv6 in the country. The center will operate alongside another facility, which is equipped with an IBM Blue Gene/P supercomputer.

Since 2015, the ISP Blizoo enabled IPv6 for many home customers.

At the end of 2016, the ISP ComNet Bulgaria Holding Ltd. has provided complete IPv6 support for all customers and households within company network in Bulgaria.

Canada
IPv6 deployment is slow but ongoing, with major Canadian ISPs (notably Bell Canada) lacking in support for its residential customers, and the majority of their business customers (including server packages). According to Google's statistics, Canada reached an IPv6 adoption rate of 39.66% as of May 2022.

Rogers Communications has deployed native IPv6 network wide, including their DOCSIS 3.0/3.1 wireline broadband network and their HSPA/LTE mobile network. In 2018, it appeared that all Wireless LTE devices in the network had only IPv6 addresses and no IPv4 gateway, IP address and DNS servers.
Shaw Communications has IPv6 including DOCSIS 3.1 for residential customers using the latest XB6 cable modems since 2018.
Fibrenoire, a Canadian Metro Ethernet fibre network operating in Quebec and Ontario, has been providing native IPv6 connectivity since 2009.
Aptum Technologies(formerly Cogeco Peer 1) has provided IPv6 backbones to Canadian data centres since 2011, as well as in its peering centers.
TekSavvy has deployed its own IPv6 network to its customers on DSL in Alberta, British Columbia, Ontario, and Quebec as well as for cable customers serviced by Rogers Communications.
Vidéotron has deployed IPv6 to customers on their Helix platform.
SaskTel has deployed IPv6 support for business customers subscribing to their Dedicated Internet or LANSpan IP product.
Telus has deployed IPv6 support for business services and residential customers with 61.23% IPv6 usage in August 2021 according to World IPv6 Launch measurements.
Origen Telecom is a Canadian internet service provider operating in Montreal and Toronto, and supports IPv6 connectivity for its business clients.
Belair Technologies Operating in Montreal, Laval and surrounding area as well as Cornwall and Toronto, and fully supports IPv6 connectivity for all its clients.
TelKel, an ISP that offers FTTH only, in Montreal, Quebec and suburbs, supports native dual-stack IPv4 and IPv6 since the beginning.
Cogeco provides IPv6 to customers.
Beanfield Metroconnect provides IPv6 for business customers.
EBOX provides IPv6 to its customers since 2013 on fiber and DSL/FTTN last-mile technologies.
GemsTelecom has provided IPv6 to its customers since 2009 on fiber and DSL/FTTN last-mile technologies.

China
The China Next Generation Internet (CNGI, 中国下一代互联网) project is an ongoing plan initiated by the Chinese government with the purpose of gaining a significant position in the development of the Internet through the early adoption of IPv6. China showcased CNGI's IPv6 infrastructure during the 2008 Summer Olympics, being the first time a major world event has had a presence on the IPv6 Internet. At the time of the event, it was believed that the Olympics provided the largest showcase of IPv6 technology since the inception of IPv6. The deployment of IPv6 was widespread in all related applications, from data networking and camera transmissions for sporting events, to civil applications, such as security cameras and taxis. The events were streamed live over the Internet and networked cars were able to monitor traffic conditions readily, all network operations of the Games being conducted using IPv6.

Also, the CERNET (China Education and Research NETwork, 中国教育和科研计算机网, 教育网) set up native IPv6 (CERNET2), and since then many academic institutions in China joined CERNET2 for IPv6 connectivity. CERNET-2 is probably the widest deployment of IPv6 in China. It is managed and operated jointly by 25 universities. Students in Shanghai Jiao Tong University and Beijing University of Posts and Telecommunications, for example, get native IPv6.

In 2017, China issued an "Action Plan for Promoting Large-scale Deployment of Internet Protocol Version 6" where it encouraged a nationwide adoption of the IPv6 network. Outlined in the plan, China had set goals to develop a next-generation internet technical system and industrial ecosystem with independent intellectual property rights in 5 to 10 years, and aimed at having the largest IPv6 network in the world by the end of 2025.

In 2018, US researchers from the Georgia Institute of Technology categorized China as being part of a group of 169 countries that had little IPv6 traffic. As of 2021, Akamai's latest State of the Internet Report asserts an IPv6 adoption rate of 23.5% among Chinese internet connections.

In July 2021, China announced plans to complete a national IPv6 rollout by 2030. It is the only country known to advocate towards a single-stack network and had earlier in May 2021, overtaken India in becoming the Number 1 country in terms of having the most IPv6 addresses in the world, with 528 million.

Czech Republic
As of September 2019, the country has a deployment ratio around 22.91%, according to both Google and APNIC stats.

O2 Czech Republic have deployed IPv6 on residential xDSL lines since 2012. It uses dual-stack PPPoE with CGN for IPv4. Only  prefix size is available via DHCP-PD.
T-Mobile Czech Republic have deployed IPv6 on residential xDSL lines since 2014. It uses dual-stack PPPoE with one public static IPv4 address and  IPv6 prefix delegated via DHCP-PD.
UPC Czech Republic have deployed IPv6 on residential DOCSIS lines since 2017. IPv6-only network with IPv4 over DS-Lite is used. Customers are forced to terminate the connection in carrier-provided CPE with limited customization options.
IPv6 is generally available in data centers and web hosting companies.

Denmark
As of April 2022, the country has only 7.22% IPv6 traffic, according to Google stats.

A web page (in Danish) follows national IPv6 deployment.

The ISP Fullrate has begun offering IPv6 to its customers, on the condition that their router (provided by the ISP itself) is compatible. If the router is of a different version, the customer has to request a new router.

Several other small ISP have already begun implementing the protocol as well as 3, the smallest mobile provider.

Estonia
Estonian Telekom is providing native IPv6 access on residential and business broadband connections since September 2014. According to Google's statistics, Estonia has reached an IPv6 adoption rate of 28% by July 2020.

Finland
FICORA (Finnish Communications Regulatory Authority), the NIC for the .fi top level domain, has added IPv6 address to DNS servers, and allows entering IPv6 address when registering domains. The registration service domain.fi for new domains is also available over IPv6.

A small Finnish ISP Nebula has offered IPv6 access since 2007.

FICORA held national IPv6 day on June 9, 2015. At that time Elisa and DNA Oyj started providing IPv6 on mobile subscriptions, and Telia Company (via 6rd) and DNA Oyj (native) started providing IPv6 on fixed-line connections.

According to Google's statistics, Finland has reached an IPv6 adoption rate of 40% .

France
AFNIC, the NIC for (among others) the .fr Top Level Domain, has implemented IPv6 operations.
Renater, the French national academical network, is offering IPv6 connectivity including multicast support to their members.
Free, a major French ISP, rolled-out IPv6 as an opt-in at end of year 2007. In 2020, it removed the possibility to opt-out, effectively reaching 99% coverage. Free also activated IPv6 on its mobile network just after Christmas 2020.
Nerim, a small ISP, provides native IPv6 for all its clients since March 2003.
Orange (formerly France Telecom), a major ISP, is currently rolling out IPv6 on its wired network. ETA Q2 2016 for FTTH and VDSL, 2017 for ADSL.
OVH has implemented IPv6.
FDN, a small associative ISP, has been providing native IPv6 since November 2008.
SFR, a major ISP, rolled out IPv6 as an opt-in on its wired network.
Bouygues Telecom plans deployment for 2017.
all mobile operators in France support IPv6 (December 2020)

As of April 2022, France has 66.73% IPv6 traffic according to Google, and 46% according to APNIC.

Germany
According to Google's statistics, Germany has reached an IPv6 adoption rate of 61% by April 2022.

DFN backbone network offers full native IPv6 support for their participants. Many scientific networks in Germany, like the Munich Scientific Network (MWN) operated by Leibniz-Rechenzentrum, are connected to this network.
Deutsche Telekom started rolling out IPv6 for new All-IP DSL customers in September 2012. Telekom started to roll out IPv6 (dual stack) in their mobile network in August 2015. In January 2020 Deutsche Telekom announced a new APN for IPv6-only. The overall deployment rate for both mobile and fixed network was 76% as of 31 December 2020.
Vodafone Kabel Deutschland and Unitymedia offer native IPv6 to their new customers. The adoption rate was 63% for both Vodafone Kabel and Unitymedia as of 31 December 2018.
, a regional carrier and ISP, offers native IPv6 for their customers. Adoption rate was 72% as of 31 December 2020.
Regional carrier and ISP NetCologne has begun offering native IPv6 to its customers. Deployment rate was 68% as of 31 December 2018.
Primacom (now part of PŸUR) offers IPv6 for their customers.
 (former Tele Columbus) offers IPv6 connectivity since end of 2014.
Deutsche Glasfaser offers ipv6 via DHCPv6 or 6rd. IPv4 connectivity is provided via CGN to its customers.
O2 has introduced IPv6 for new DSL customers in 2018.
Vodafone started with IPv6 in its mobile network end of 2019.
O2 Germany started to roll out IPv6 in its mobile network, first only for new contracts, later step by step for all customers till end of June 2021

Hong Kong

Hungary

In Hungary Externet was the first ISP starting deploying IPv6 on its network in 2008 August. The service was commercially available since 2009 May.

Magyar Telekom was running tests on its production environments since the beginning of 2009. Free customer trials started on November 2, 2009, for those on ADSL or Fiber Optic. Customers are given a  via DHCP-ND unless they register their DUID in which case they receive a /56 using a static configuration results in a single .

According to information on telecompaper.com, UPC Hungary will start deploying IPv6 in mid-2013, finishing it in 2013. The plan has not materialized until the end of 2015.

In 2015, December RCS&RDS (Digi) has enabled native dual-stack IPv6 (customers receive dynamic /64 prefixes) for its FTTB/H customers. In November the same year UPC Hungary introduced DS Lite(with private IPv4 addresses) which can be enabled on a customer-to-customer basis if the customer asks for it.

Magyar Telekom deployed dual-stack IPv6 (using dynamic /56 prefixes on DSL and GPON and static  prefixes on DOCSIS) for all of its wired (and for all of its compatible mobile) customers in October 2016.

According to the statistics of APNIC, IPv6 use in Hungary as of 2018 December has reached around 20%.

According to Google's IPv6 statistics the adoption rate in Hungary as of April 2022 is 42%.

India
According to Google's statistics, India has reached an IPv6 adoption rate of around 68.94% in January 2023.

As of 2022, APNIC placed India at more than 75% preferring IPv6.

Department of Telecommunications, of the government of India has run workshops on IPv6 on 13 February 2015 at Silvassa & on 11 February 2015, at DoT headquarters, New Delhi. They have also released roadmaps on IPv6 deployment.
Sify Technologies Limited, a private Internet service provider, rolled out IPv6 in 2005. Sify has a dual-stack network that supports commercial services on IPv6 transport for its enterprise customers. Sify is a sponsored member of 6Choice, a project by India-Europe cooperation to promote IPv6 adoption. Sify.com is the first to launch a dual-stack commercial portal.
ERNET The Indian Education and Research Network, Department of Electronics & IT of the government of India is providing dual-stack networks from 2006 onwards and has been part of many EU funded initiative such as 6Choice, 6lowpan, Myfire, GEANT etc. ERNET's own websites and those hosted of other organisations are all running on dual stack. ERNET provides Consultancy and Turnkey project Implementation to organisations migrating to IPv6 along with fulfilling their Training needs. ERNET has an IPv6 central facility aimed at system and network administrators to provide hands-on training in the use and configuration of web, mail, proxy, DNS and other such servers on IPv6 spearheaded by Praveen Misra, an IPv6 evangelist.
Reliance JIO has deployed and is offering IPv6 services in India since September 2016, and has migrated 200M of their Internet users on their IPv6 only mobile network by the end of 2017. As of May 2022, Reliance had an IPv6 adoption rate of over 92%.
Department of Telecom (DoT) has set the below deadline to complete the transition to IPv6.
All Government organisations should complete IPv6 transition and migration of their websites on IPv6 latest by 30 June 2022.
All new retail wireline customer connections provided by Service Providers after 31 December 2022 shall be capable of carrying IPv6 traffic either on dual stack or on native IPV6.
The Service Providers shall endeavour to progressively replace/upgrade the CPEs which are not IPv6 ready and are owned by Service Providers latest by 31 December 2022.
BSNL created a webpage for Franchises of Bharat Fibre to configure IPv6 for various ONT's. Refer Franchisee Facilitation Center - Configure IPv6

Ireland
eir, dual-stack, VDSL2, FTTH, & 3GPP Mobile
Virgin Media, DS-Lite, DOCSIS

Growth of IPv6 in Ireland as seen by Google.

Italy
Fastweb announced in 2015 the initial availability of IPv6 addresses for its residential customers.
TIM, the largest Italian ISP, has offered since 2017 a basic pilot service in order to allow its customers to connect using IPv6. However, at the beginning of 2022 several users began to report the removal of the PPPoE profile used to provide IPv6, it seems that TIM has completely abandoned IPv6 in its network.
Sky Wifi provides IPv6 service. SkyWiFi started using dual stack, but will switch to an IPv6-only network using MAP-T for IPv4 connectivity
Dimensione provides IPv6 by assigning a  via DHCPv6 Prefix Delegation with IPv4 in Dual Stack.
Pianeta Fibra provides IPv6 by assigning a  via DHCPv6 Prefix Delegation with IPv4 Dual Stack.
Navigabene provides IPv6 by assigning a  via DHCPv6 Prefix Delegation with IPv4 Dual Stack.
Iliad provides IPv6 by assigning a  via DHCPv6 Prefix Delegation with MAP-E for IPv4 connectivity.
Aruba.it Fibra provides IPv6 by assigning a  via IPv6 over PPPoE with IPv4 Dual Stack.
Spadhausen provides IPv6 by assigning a  via DHCPv6 Prefix Delegation with IPv4 in Dual Stack.
Convergenze provides IPv6 by assigning a  via DHCPv6 Prefix Delegation with IPv4 in Dual Stack.
Ehiweb provides IPv6 by assigning a  via DHCPv6 Prefix Delegation with IPv4 in Dual Stack.
According to Google's statistics, Italy had an IPv6 adoption rate of 5.29% by January 2022.

Japan
Telecommunications company NTT announced itself as the world's first ISP to offer public availability of IPv6 services in March 2000.
NTT's NGN allows for native IPv6 over Ethernet connection to various ISPs. Some ISPs provide the option to use IPv6 transition mechanisms such as DS-Lite or MAP-E as an alternative to IPv4 PPPoE. By March 2021, 80% of NTT NGN users had IPv6 internet access through an ISP operating on the NGN.
NTT Docomo, the largest cell phone operator in Japan, started providing IPv6 dual-stack service to devices sold since Summer 2017. In June 2021, they announced that they would be transitioning to a NAT64/DNS64-based single-stack IPv6 network starting in Spring 2022.

According to Google's statistics, Japan had an IPv6 adoption rate of 43.79% by April 2022.

Lebanon
Telecommunications company Ogero enabled IPv6 support for DSL users and for private operators since July 2018

Lithuania
The LITNET academic & research network has supported IPv6 since 2001. Most commercial ISPs have not publicly deployed IPv6 yet.

Luxembourg
RESTENA, the national research and education network, has been running IPv6 for a number of years. It is connected to the European GEANT2 network. In addition, it runs one of the country Internet exchanges, which supports IPv6 peering. RESTENA also runs the .lu top level domain, which also supports IPv6.
P&T Luxembourg, main telecom and Internet service providers, has announced they have production quality IPv6 connectivity since January 2009, with the first professional customers being connected as of September 2009. Deployment of IPv6 to residential customers is expected to take place in 2010.
According to Google's statistics, Luxembourg reached an IPv6 adoption rate of 36% by July 2020.

Netherlands
SURFnet, maintainer of the Dutch academical network SURFnet, introduced IPv6 to its network 1997, in the beginning using IPv6-to-IPv4 tunnels. Its backbone is entirely running dual-stack, supporting both native IPv4 and IPv6 to most of its users.
XS4All was a major Dutch ISP. In 2002 XS4All was the first Dutch broadband provider to introduce IPv6 to its network, but it has only been experimental. In May 2009 the provider provided the first native IPv6 DSL connections. In August 2010 native IPv6 DSL connections became available to almost all their customers. Since June 2012 native IPv6 was enabled by default for all new customers.
Business-orientated Internet provider BIT BV has been providing IPv6 to all their customers (DSL, FTTH, colocated) since 2004.
SixXS had two private Dutch founders and has been partnering with IPv6 Internet service providers in many countries to provide IPv6 connectivity via IP tunnels to users worldwide since 2000. It started out as IPng.nl with a predominantly Dutch user base and reorganized as SixXS to be able to reach users internationally and be diversified in ISP support. SixXS also provided various other related services and software which contributed significantly to IPv6 adoption and operation globally. They ceased their operation on 6-6-2017.
Business ISP Introweb provides an IPv6-only 8 Mbit/s ADSL connection for 6 euro per month to 100 customers as a pilot, both for companies to learn how to adapt to IPv6 as for themselves in working on a fully IPv6 enabled network.
Signet is the first ISP in the country which provides IPv6 connectivity together with IPv4 on multiple national fiber networks (Eurofiber, Glasvezel Eindhoven, BRE, Glasnet Veghel, Ziggo, and Fiber Port).
Most Dutch hosting companies, including the biggest one, Leaseweb, support IPv6, but customers by default get only IPv4 address.
Several government sites (such as Rijksoverheid.nl) are available via IPv6.
On July 13, 2010, native IPv6 over UMTS/GPRS was successfully tested in Belgium and The Netherlands within a vehicle platform as an Intelligent transportation system solution. The test was performed both in GSM and in tethering mode using a Nokia smart-phone. This test was performed by Logica Netherlands within the SPITS project, in cooperation with Mobistar Belgium.
In 2018 KPN started issuing  address blocks to their business clients for a one-time fee.
T-Mobile Netherlands doesn't have plans to deploy IPv6 yet.

New Zealand
In 2012, surveys conducted by the New Zealand IPv6 Task Force indicated that awareness of IPv6 had reached a near-universal level among New Zealand's large public- and private-sector organizations, with adoption mostly occurring as part of normal network refresh cycles. Most of New Zealand's ISP and carrier community have a test environment for IPv6 and many have started bringing IPv6 products and services on-stream. An increasing number of New Zealand government websites are available over IPv6, including those of the Ministry of Defence (New Zealand), Ministry for Primary Industries (New Zealand) and the Department of Internal Affairs.

Massey University has enabled IPv6 on its border and core campus routers. Its central network services, including DNS, external email and NTP are also enabled. Massey's main website is IPv6-enabled and remote login to some servers and network equipment also supports IPv6 for systems administration and networking staff.
IPv6 has been enabled on 15 websites hosted at Tauranga City Council (TCC). Changes to equipment on the council's internal LAN have also been made to enable IPV6. Some internal networks across the organization have been enabled for IPv6, and dual-stack technology is being used to enable both IPv4 and IPv6 use. A number of internal servers and client devices communicate via IPv6, and a teredo relay and 6to4 relay ensure users using these two transition technologies are well served when accessing IPV6 addresses.
The University of Auckland IT Services team has partially deployed IPv6, in collaboration with the Science Faculty and the Computer Science Department. It has IPv6 connectivity via KAREN and its commercial ISP. Computer Science is fully dual-stacked; IPv6 has been used in undergraduate laboratory assignments and for post-graduate projects.
KAREN, New Zealand's R&E network, is an IPv6 native network and has provided IPv6 as a standard service offering to its members since 2006.
Auckland-based ISP WorldxChange Communications has had dual-stack since 2008. It has started providing residential customers with dual (IPv4 and IPv6) service using DHCPv6, on a trial basis.
Government Technology Services, a business group of the Department of Internal Affairs (DIA), has an IPv6 website as a proof of concept to demonstrate how New Zealand government websites can be made accessible to the IPv6 Internet.
South Island-based Internet Service Provider Snap Internet provides native IPv6 connectivity for all its customers. Its network is fully IPv6-enabled, with the IPv6 service running alongside Snap's normal IPv4 connectivity.
Palmerston North-based ISP Inspire Net has had native IPv6 transit since late 2009.
Internet Service Provider DTS's transit, managed and hosting services are fully IPv6 capable.
Trans-Tasman service provider Vocus Communications offers full dual-stack IP transit services and also supports IPv6 transport on its private IP WAN service in NZ.

Philippines
The government is in process of upgrading its facilities. Globe Telecom has already set in motion the transition of its core IP network to IPv6, noting that it is now fully prepared even as the Internet runs out of IPv4 addresses. Globe claims it is the first local telecommunication company to test IPv6 with Department of Science and Technology (Philippines). In some cases, like test networks or users, IPv6 or both may be present Since then, Globe Telecom has successfully deployed IPv6 in 2020 on its 5G network and in 2021 on its fiber and 4G network.

University of the Philippines Diliman is part of the World IPv6 Launch and deployed IPv6 on its network since 2011.

PLDT takes lead in IPv6 deployment in the Philippines and provides IPv6 to its customers since 2020.

Dito Telecommunity provides IPv6 to its customers since its start of operation.

Sky Cable on its Sky Fiber broadband service provides IPv6 to its customers since 2019.

Radius Telecoms on its Red Fiber broadband service provides IPv6 to its customers since 2022.

Poland
The Polish national research and education network began an IPv6 trial period in 2002. As for now native IPv6 connectivity is available to numerous educational and private clients connected via citywide networks operated by local universities.
Polish Internet Exchange, a commercial and carrier-neutral Internet traffic exchange point, has facilitated IPv6 peering between numerous operators since 2008.
Orange Polska In March 2013, the mobile operator launched mobile access to the Internet via IPv6 protocol for their subscribers. In September 2013, Sony Xperia Z1 became the first IPv6-compliant device commercially available in Orange Poland.

Romania
As of June 2012, the ISP named RCS&RDS offers dual-stack IPv4/IPv6 PPPoE services to current home users using modern versions of Microsoft Windows, Mac OS X, Linux and other IPv6-ready devices. More than 1 million RCS & RDS residential customers can now use native IPv6 on a dual-stack PPPoE connection and 16% already do.

Russian Federation
ER-Telecom offers native IPv6 to customers since 10.10.2013 using PPPoE Dual-Stack and DHCPv6 Prefix Delegation
MTS provides native IPv6 for mobile customers since April 2017

Saudi Arabia 

 As of 2021, IPv6 deployment reached 44% - 48%.

Serbia
Supernova network has started IPv6 beta test, since December 2021.

Spain
 2023 Telefónica España/Movistar Spain began upgrading its mobile network to enable IPv6 connectivity.

Sri Lanka
LEARN network had deployed IPv6, since 2008.
Dialog Axiata provides native IPv6 to customers by default, since 2018.
SLT provides native IPv6 to Fixed LTE customers, since 2018.
Mobitel provides native IPv6, since 2020.

Sudan
The Sudanese IPv6 task Force SDv6TF was formed in 2010 to fellow the implementation of IPv6 migration plan (2011–2015).

By November 2012, all telecom operators are becoming IPv6 enabled, this was tested for the first time at the AFRINIC-17 meeting held in Khartoum.

SudREN (Sudanese Research and Education Network) is the first ISP to provide native IPv6 connectivity of the member institution. By August 2014, SudREN.edu.sd is fully IPv6 Enabled.
Two certification received from IPv6 Forum, for WWW and ISP Enabled Logos.

Sweden
Bahnhof offers IPv6 to businesses.
Tele2 have begun IPv6 rollout to mobile customers (both consumers and businesses).
Tre rolled out IPv6 in 2018.
Com Hem offers IPv6 to businesses and to consumers in some locations.

Operators offering native IPv6 access for business clients and collocation customers include Tele2 and Phonera.

Switzerland
The Data Center Light is the first commercial IPv6 only data center in Switzerland
Swisscom offers IPv6 over 6rd to private customers.
Init7 offers native IPv6 on all their offerings.
iway offers native IPv6 on customer lines.
Sunrise provides IPv6 for some of the products, private customers can enable 6rd.
UPC Switzerland offers native IPv6 with DS-lite to new customers.

Tunisia
Started deploying IPv6 in 2010. In 2011, ATI (Tunisian Internet Agency) obtained a new IPv6 block from AFRINIC (2c0f:fab0::/28). In 2013–2015, Gnet (Global Net), and CIMSP (Computing Departement of Health Ministry) received IPv6 prefixes from AFRINIC. Deployment of an IPv6 tunnel between ATI and HE (Hurricane Electric). In 2016, CCK (Centre de Calcul El Khawarizmi) obtains its own IPv6 (/32) block from AFRINIC. In 2016, ISET Charguia (Higher Institute of Technologies in Tunisia) deployed its IPv6 network as end user.

Ukraine
Some IPv6 implementation has taken place.

United Kingdom
JANET, the UK's education and research network, introduced IPv6 unicast support into its service level agreement in 2008. Several major UK universities and colleges (e.g., Cambridge and Esher College) upgraded their campus routing infrastructure to provide IPv6 unicast support to their users.
Andrews & Arnold launched a native (non-tunneled) IPv6 service in October 2005 and offer IPv6 by default.
IDNet have offered native IPv6 (dual stack with IPv4) as standard since at least 2011.
The UK government started to replace much of its Government Secure Intranet (a wide area network) with a new Public Services Network (PSN) in late 2009. The aspiration was to deploy using IPv6 and support IPv4. The implementation is based on IPv4 but suppliers must be capable of supporting IPv6.
BT Group announced in August 2016 that most of its customers can expect IPv6 connectivity in early 2017.
Zen Internet enabled IPv6 for all customers in December 2015, after a successful trial earlier that year.
Spitfire Network Services offer native dual-stack IPv6 on broadband and Ethernet services.
Sky Broadband enabled IPv6 for a majority of their customers in the first half of 2016.
EE Limited enabled IPv6 on the Radio access network for most consumers by Autumn 2018. Their home broadband services currently do not support IPv6 however.
Aquiss enabled IPv6 for their broadband customers in 2015. In February 2020 they completed their IPv6 rollout for services and systems i.e. web hosting platform, VOIP and other services.

According to Google's statistics, United Kingdom has reached an IPv6 adoption rate of 43.55% as of April 2022.

United States
In the United States the majority of smartphones use IPv6, but only a small percent of computers and tablets use IPv6. , 46.2% of Google users in the US use IPv6.

Further countries
As of January 2021
Malaysia 50.06% IPv6 adoption
Vietnam 44.6% IPv6 adoption
Mexico 37.89% IPv6 adoption
Portugal 37.12% IPv6 adoption

Events

World IPv6 Day
The Internet Society promoted June 8, 2011, as "World IPv6 Day". The event was described as a "test drive" for full IPv6 rollouts.

World IPv6 Launch
The Internet Society declared June 6, 2012, to be the date for "World IPv6 Launch", with participating major websites enabling IPv6 permanently, participating ISPs offering IPv6 connectivity, and participating router manufacturers offering devices enabled for IPv6 by default.

See also
IPv6 brokenness and DNS whitelisting

References

External links
World IPV6 Launch Measurements - updated regularly
IPv6 adoption statistics at Google - updated regularly

IPv6
Technological change